Lapira is a surname. Notable people with the surname include:

 Liza Lapira (born 1981), American actress
 Joseph Lapira (born 1986), American soccer player

See also
 Giorgio La Pira (1904–1977), Italian politician